Stanislav Sventek (9 November 1930 in Nová Ves – 27 October 2000) was an ice hockey player who played for the Czechoslovak national team. He won a bronze medal at the 1964 Winter Olympics. He also won a silver medal at 1961 Ice Hockey World Championships and bronze medals at 1957 and 1963 Ice Hockey World Championships.

References

External links

1930 births
2000 deaths
Czechoslovak ice hockey defencemen
HC Plzeň players
Ice hockey players at the 1964 Winter Olympics
Medalists at the 1964 Winter Olympics
Olympic bronze medalists for Czechoslovakia
Olympic ice hockey players of Czechoslovakia
Olympic medalists in ice hockey
People from Plzeň-South District
Sportspeople from the Plzeň Region
Czech ice hockey defencemen
Czechoslovak expatriate sportspeople in Austria
Czechoslovak expatriate ice hockey people
Expatriate ice hockey players in Austria
VEU Feldkirch players